The following radio stations broadcast on AM frequency 1242kHz.

Australia
3GV at Traralgon, Victoria
4AK

Japan
JOLF, master station at Tokyo.

New Zealand
1XX at Whakatane

Philippines
DWBL at Mandaluyong

References

Lists of radio stations by frequency